Denmark participated at the Junior Eurovision Song Contest 2005, sending their third entry to the contest. The Danish entry was Nicolai Kielstrup with the song "Shake Shake Shake", which was the winner of the Danish national selection MGP 2005.

Before Junior Eurovision

MGP 2005 
DR held the 6th edition of the MGP contest on 17 September 2005 to select the Danish entry to the Junior Eurovision Song Contest. 

The final was held at the DR TV Studios in Copenhagen, hosted by Jacob Riising. The winner was chosen through two rounds of televoting and SMS voting: firstly, the top 5 songs were selected from the 10 competing songs to progress to the superfinal, where the final winner was chosen through another round of televoting. The votes were distributed among a number of regions, who gave points to each song.

The winner was Nicolai Kielstrup with his song "Shake Shake Shake", receiving 96 points.

At Junior Eurovision
Nicolai performed 2nd in the running order of the contest, held in Hasselt, Belgium, following Greece and preceding Croatia. At the close of the voting Denmark received 121 points, placing 4th of the 16 competing entries, Denmark's best placing at the contest.

Voting

Notes

References

Junior Eurovision Song Contest
Denmark
Junior Eurovision Song Contest
Junior